The Theodore Hausmann Estate is a historic site in Vero Beach, Florida. It is located at 4800 16th Street. On March 14, 1997, it was added to the U.S. National Register of Historic Places.

References

External links
 Indian River County listings at National Register of Historic Places
 Indian River County listings at Florida's Office of Cultural and Historical Programs

Houses on the National Register of Historic Places in Florida
National Register of Historic Places in Indian River County, Florida
Buildings and structures in Vero Beach, Florida
Houses in Indian River County, Florida
Vernacular architecture in Florida
1922 establishments in Florida
Houses completed in 1922